Johns was a community in Pushmataha County, Oklahoma, United States, located north of Antlers.  

A United States Post Office operated there from September 28, 1912, to May 15, 1915. It took its name from nearby Johns Valley, which had been named for Henry A. Johns, a Choctaw Indian land allottee.

References

Geography of Pushmataha County, Oklahoma
Ghost towns in Oklahoma